The International Rafting Federation (IRF) is the official umbrella International Sports Federation for national rafting organizations worldwide, and administers all aspects of rafting sport worldwide.  The World Rafting Championships (WRC) the European Rafting Championships (ERC), the Pan American Rafting Championships, and the Euro Cup rafting series are governed by the IRF.  The IRF works closely with national organisations and government bodies by offering the only raft guide certification program accepted worldwide. In 2019 the IRF was awarded Observer Status by the Global Association of International Sports Federations (GAISF).

Disciplines
Raft Sprint (formerly Time Trial)
Raft Head-to-Head
Raft Slalom
Raft Downriver

Age Divisions
Masters - ages 40+
Youth - ages 15–19
Junior - ages 15–23
Open - ages 15+

Executive Board
Mr. Joseph Willis Jones, President and Chair of Board of Directors
Mr. Eric Boudreau, First Vice President, Chair of Sport and Competition
Mr. Gaspar Goncz, Second Vice President, Chair of Guide Training and Education
Mr. Pieter Bekkers, Treasurer and Chief Financial Officer
Ms. Sue Liell-Cock, Secretary General
Mr. Kianoosh Mehrabi, Chair of River Conservation

References

External links
Official website
GAISF Observer

International sports organizations
Rafting